Pearl V Puri (born 10 July 1989) is an Indian actor. Puri is best known for playing Mahir Sehgal/Mihir Sippi in Naagin 3 and Raghbir Malhotra in Bepanah Pyaar.

Early life
Pearl V Puri was born on 10 July 1989 in Chhindwara, Madhya Pradesh, into a Punjabi Hindu Khatri family to Vipin Puri and Pummy Puri. He has an elder sister Reet Vohra aka Quety Puri. Puri started his schooling at Maharishi Vidya Mandir Public School, Chhindwara. After a few years his family moved to Agra, Uttar Pradesh where he was enrolled at Raghendra Swarup Public School.

Puri was inspired to be an actor after his ex girlfriend was a fan of Shah Rukh Khan. His father wanted him to join their family business but his mother supported his decision of becoming an actor. He began his career as a model and appeared in several commercials for various brands like Maruti Ritz, Fair One Cream, Pizza Hut.

Puri's father died in October 2020 following a heart attack.

Personal life
Pearl V Puri was arrested on 4 June 2021 for an alleged molestation case of a minor girl the set of his tv serial in 2019 and was granted bail after being in Jail over 10 days on 15 June 2021.

Career

2013–2017: Initial struggles 

Puri made his acting debut on television with a supporting role as Ajay Tiwari in the love-triangle Dil Ki Nazar Se Khoobsurat on Sony TV produced by Shashi Sumeet Productions in 2013.

In 2015, he had his first leading role in Saurabh Tewari Films' musical romantic drama Phir Bhi Na Maane...Badtameez Dil on Star Plus opposite Asmita Sood as Abeer Malhotra, a successful charming rockstar. Although the show ran for just 5 months, he gained recognition for his role as Abeer that earned him a Best Fresh New Face (Male) nomination at Indian Telly Awards. The show initially ended on 19 September, however the show came back on Hotstar and ran until 18 November.

In January 2016, Puri signed Swastik Pictures' television show Meri Saasu Maa on Zee TV; he was cast as Satyendra Sharma opposite Hiba Nawab. In May 2016, he joined the cast of Yash A Patnaik's fantasy TV series Naagarjuna – Ek Yoddha on Life OK as the simple and innocent Arjun Shastri, a garage worker opposite Pooja Banerjee. The series ended in January 2017.

2018–present: Limited popularity 

In 2018, he found his biggest break with the third season of Ekta Kapoor's successful supernatural franchise Naagin. His portrayal of Mahir Sehgal/Mihir Sippi and chemistry with co-actress Surbhi Jyoti gained a lot of attention, making him a household name. He won the Best Actor Male (Critics) category at Gold Awards and received nominations for Best Actor Male (Popular) and Best Onscreen Jodi (Popular) at Indian Telly Awards. The show achieved high TRPs and ended in May 2019 after 103 episodes, becoming the longest season of the franchise.

In 2019, Puri made his discography debut with Peerh Meri co-starring Anita Hassanandani. He participated in Khatra Khatra Khatra and the fifth season of Kitchen Champion, both of which aired on Colors TV. He also appeared in the fourth season of Box Cricket League.

In June 2019, Puri collaborated with Kapoor again for the romantic mystery thriller Bepanah Pyaar on Colors TV starring as the depressed and alcoholic Raghbir Malhotra alongside Aparna Dixit and Ishita Dutta. The show went off air in February 2020.

In 2020, he featured in the music videos Teri Aankhon Mein and Teri Aankhon Mein Dance Cover. In September 2020, he started shooting for the second season of Zee TV supernatural show Brahmarakshas, his third consecutive collaboration with Kapoor, playing the main lead Angad Mehra opposite Nikki Sharma. The series premiered in November 2020, but went off air within five months in April 2021 due to low TRPs.

In the media
In 2018, Puri was ranked first in Times of Indias Most Desirable Men on TV List.

Television

Special appearances

Music videos

Awards and nominations

References

External links

Living people
1989 births
Indian male models
21st-century Indian male actors
Indian male soap opera actors
People from Agra
Male actors in Hindi television
Indian male television actors